Craig Davies is an English singer/songwriter from Manchester, who was active from 1988 to 1990 and released two albums on the Rough Trade music label.  He was at one point vocalist for the band Easterhouse, but left after signing a solo deal with Rough Trade.  He has also collaborated with Vini Reilly, Ben Watt and Badly Drawn Boy.

Albums
Like Narcissus (Rough Trade, 1988)
Groovin' on a Shaft Cycle (Rough Trade, 1990)

EPs
"I Don't Want It" (Rough Trade, 1987)

Singles
"Jennifer Holiday" (Rough Trade, 1988)

References

Year of birth missing (living people)
Living people
English male singer-songwriters